Frances Grant Starr (June 6, 1881 – June 11, 1973) was an American stage, film and television actress.

Early years
Starr's parents were Charles Edward Starr and Emma (née Grant). She had two half sisters, and her father died when she was a child.

Career 
Starr started in plays in 1901 in an Albany stock company, in which Lionel Barrymore and Alison Skipworth were members. She signed with David Belasco in 1906 and appeared in a small role with David Warfield in The Music Master.

In November 1906 she appeared along with another young actress, Jane Cowl, in The Rose of the Rancho. She achieved her breakout stage role in 1909 in Belasco's production of The Easiest Way. Starr continued to have a string of successes such as The Case of Becky (1912) and Shore Leave (1922). Several of the plays she starred in were turned into early silent films often by Famous Players-Lasky. 

She delivered a standout role as the wronged mother in Five Star Final (1931), an early talkie about newspaper corruption. It was her second of only three sound films. Lastly she appeared in This Reckless Age (1932) with Buddy Rogers and Richard Bennett. On television, Starr appeared on Studio One, Omnibus, Kraft Television Theatre and other programs.

Starr's Broadway credits included The Ladies of the Corridor (1953), The Sacred Flame (1952), The Long Days (1951), The Young and Fair (1948), Claudia (1941), The Good (1938), Field of Ermine (1935), Lady Jane (1934), Moor Born (1934), The Lake (1933), Diplomacy (1928), Immoral Isabella? (1927), The Shelf (1926), Shore Leave (1922), The Easiest Way (1921), One (1920), Tiger! Tiger! (1918), Little Lady in Blue (1916), Marie-Odile (1915), The Secret (1914), The Secret (1913), The Case of Becky (1912), The Easiest Way  (1909), The Rose of the Rancho (1906), Gallops (1906), and Nell Gwyn (1901).

Personal life
Starr's marriages to artist William Haskell Coffin and banker R. Golden Donaldson ended in divorce. She was widowed by her third husband, attorney Emil C. Wetten.

Death 
Starr died on June 11, 1973, at her home at age 92.

Filmography
Tiger Rose (1923) as Minor Role
The Star Witness (1931) as Ma Leeds
Five Star Final (1931) as Nancy 'Voorhees' Townsend
This Reckless Age (1932) as Eunice Ingals
Ford Theatre Hour (1949, TV Series) as Margaret 'Marmee' March
Hallmark Hall of Fame (1952, TV Series) as Anna Warner
Crime Photographer (1952, TV Series)
Studio One (1952-1953, TV Series) as Mrs. Fairfax
Omnibus (1953, TV Series) as Mother (segment "The Sojourner")
Love Story (1954, TV Series)
Center Stage (1954, TV Series)
Mr. Citizen (1955, TV Series) as Sophie Farnham
Kraft Television Theatre (1955, TV Series) as Nora
The Philco-Goodyear Television Playhouse (1955, TV Series)

References

External links

 
 
 "ALL-STAR CAST ON CEDRIC; Five Prominent Actresses Back for Work"  (Frances Starr, Jane Cowl, Pamela Gaythorne, Dorothy Donnelly and Mrs LeMoyne return from European vacation on RMS Cedric); The New York Times, August 4, 1912
 Frances Starr portrait gallery at New York Public Library Billy Rose digital collection
 Frances Starr (University of Washington, Sayre collection)

1881 births
1973 deaths
Actresses from New York (state)
American stage actresses
American film actresses
American television actresses
People from Oneonta, New York
Place of death missing
20th-century American actresses